Edward Jarvis FRAS FRHistS (born 1975) is a British author of religious history, politics and theology, and an Anglican clergyman. His books address previously underresearched topics, namely the Independent Sacramental Movement and the introduction of Christianity in Southeast Asia, particularly in Vietnam, Myanmar (Burma), and Malaysia.

Early life and education
Edward Jarvis was born in Kingston upon Hull, England, in 1975, to an English father and an Italian mother. His great-grandfather was the Italian film actor Umberto Sclanizza. He is a first cousin (five times removed) of travel writer, novelist, and biblical translator George Borrow and a distant cousin of Colonel Sir Weston Jarvis, an MP and Chair of the Royal Empire Society. Jarvis attended the Malet Lambert School before studying theology and religious studies at Trinity & All Saints College, York St John, and the Logos Institute of Theology.

Work
Jarvis authored the first ever biographies of Brazilian bishop Carlos Duarte Costa and the Vietnamese archbishop Ngô Đình Thục, brother of President Ngô Đình Diệm. He has contributed to periodicals of church and society interest. In 2021 and 2022 he produced two volumes on the history and theology of the Anglican Churches in Southeast Asia.

Honours
Jarvis was elected a Fellow of the Royal Asiatic Society (FRAS) in 2019. He was previously a Fellow of the Royal Anthropological Institute. In 2021 he was elected a Fellow of the Royal Historical Society (FRHistS).

Selected bibliography

References

External links
 Independent Catholic Heritage Series, http://apocryphilepress.com/book-series/independent-catholic-heritage-series/

Living people
1975 births
People from Kingston upon Hull
English people of Italian descent
British historians of religion
English Christian theologians
Academics of Durham University
Alumni of Leeds Trinity University
Fellows of the Royal Historical Society